Bidzina Mikiashvili (born 28 May 1968) is a Georgian weightlifter. He competed in the men's light heavyweight event at the 1996 Summer Olympics.

References

External links
 

1968 births
Living people
Male weightlifters from Georgia (country)
Olympic weightlifters of Georgia (country)
Weightlifters at the 1996 Summer Olympics
Place of birth missing (living people)
20th-century people from Georgia (country)